Steve or Stephen Sparks may refer to:
Robert Stephen John Sparks (born 1949), British volcanologist
Steve Sparks (pitcher, born 1965), Major League Baseball pitcher, 1995–2004 and Houston Astros radio broadcaster
Steve Sparks (pitcher, born 1975), MLB pitcher for the Pittsburgh Pirates, 2000